Kulin is a surname. Notable people with the surname include:

Ayşe Kulin (born 1941), Turkish novelist, screenwriter, and columnist
Ban Kulin (1163–1204), Bosnian monarch 
György Kulin (1905–1989), Hungarian astronomer
Károly Kulin-Nagy (1910–1992), Hungarian Olympic shooter